The American Center for Law & Justice (ACLJ) is a politically conservative, Christian-based legal organization in the United States. It is headquartered in Washington, D.C., and associated with Regent University School of Law in Virginia Beach, Virginia.

The ACLJ was founded in 1990 by law school graduate and evangelical minister Pat Robertson with the stated "mandate to protect religious and constitutional freedoms". ACLJ generally pursues constitutional issues and conservative Christian ideals in courts of law. The leaders of the ACLJ also occasionally engage in public debates to present their perspective on legal and constitutional issues.

The ACLJ is described as being "committed to ensuring the ongoing viability of freedom and liberty in the United States and around the world" by "focusing on U.S. constitutional law, European Union law and human rights law" to protect "universal, God-given and inalienable rights," according to Charity Navigator, which also issued a "Low Concern" advisory for the District of Columbia branch and a "Moderate Concern" for the Virginia Beach branch about the group after The Washington Post reported that ACLJ has paid Donald Trump's personal attorney Jay Sekulow and his family millions of dollars.

History
The ACLJ arose in part as a right-leaning political answer to the left-leaning American Civil Liberties Union. The name and acronym, ACLJ, was chosen to contrast with the ACLU.
It has attracted much media attention for its lawsuits, such as its campaign to oppose changes to the constitution of Kenya that, according to the group, would permit abortion and Islamic law, and its attempts to block the construction of an Islamic cultural center near the former site of the World Trade Center. The ACLJ supported blocking the construction of the center through New York City’s Landmarks Preservation Commission.

In November 2010, the ACLJ asked that the U.S. Justice Department investigate the Congressional Muslim Staffer Association's weekly prayer session on Capitol Hill, alleging that the organization demonstrated "a pattern of inviting Islamic extremists with ties to terrorism to participate in these events".

In 2018, ACLJ attorney Jay Sekulow was serving on President Donald Trump's personal legal team. Another Sekulow client at the time was the American Christian pastor Andrew Brunson, in detention and facing charges in Turkey.

Donations
Since 2011, donations to ACLJ are routed through Sekulow's family-run Christian Advocates Serving Evangelism (CASE), and many "transactions that benefit members of the Sekulow family are disclosed on the CASE returns, but not the ACLJ's." ACLJ's and CASE's tax returns show that between 1998 and 2011 they paid more than $33 million to Sekulow, members of his family, and businesses owned or co-owned by them. from 2011 to 2015, the two charities paid $5.5 million to Sekulow and members of his family, and $23 million to their businesses.

Sekulow is half-owner of the for-profit corporation Constitutional Litigation and Advocacy Group whose governor and executive officer is Stuart Roth, one of his partners in the law firm and real estate business that declared bankruptcy in 1986. From 2011 to 2016, the ACLJ paid the group $23 million, "its largest outside expense."

Europe
In 1997 Jay Sekulow and Thomas Patrick Monaghan, Chief Counsel and Senior Counsel of the ACLJ, respectively, set up the European Center for Law and Justice (ECLJ) in Strasbourg as part of the ACLJ's international strategy. Sekulow serves as Chief Counsel for the ECLJ. The following year the ACLJ set up the Slavic Center for Law and Justice (SCLJ) in Moscow. Both organizations on the European mainland have a full-time staff of religious rights attorneys. The ECLJ is active in the United Nations Organization and in the Council of Europe, and represents the interests of some Christians in the Court of Human Rights in Strasbourg.

Africa
The ACLJ is one of several American Christian groups that are promoting conservative Christian laws in Africa, supporting controversial movements regarding LGBT rights, including support in Uganda for criminalizing homosexuality.

Criticism
The ACLJ has been criticized by the ACLU for its stance on putting prayer in public school, and by Americans United for conflating support of separation of church and state with being anti-religious. The Human Rights Campaign is critical of the ACLJ's finances citing that the organization does not meet "10 out of 20 of the Better Business Bureau’s standards for charity accountability" and that ACLJ obfuscates how much Sekulow earns from the organization.

See also
Karen Brauer

References

External links
American Center for Law & Justice

American Christian political organizations
Anti-abortion organizations in the United States
Conservative organizations in the United States
Civil liberties advocacy groups in the United States
Government watchdog groups in the United States
Legal advocacy organizations in the United States
Organizations established in 1990
Non-profit organizations based in Washington, D.C.